The Court of Chancery of the County Palatine of Lancaster was a court of chancery that exercised jurisdiction within the County Palatine of Lancaster until it was merged into the High Court in 1972.

Relevant legislation
The court was regulated by the following Acts in particular:

The Court of Chancery of Lancaster Act 1850 (13 & 14 Vict c 43)
The Court of Chancery of Lancaster Act 1854 (17 & 18 Vict c 82)
The Chancery of Lancaster Act 1890 (53 & 54 Vict c 23)
The Court of Chancery of Lancaster Act 1952 (15 & 16 Geo 6 and Eliz 2 c 49)
The Court of Chancery of Lancaster (Amendment) Act 1961 (9 & 10 Eliz 2 c 38)

All of these Acts were repealed by section 56 of, and Schedule 11 to, the Courts Act 1971.

Funds in court

Section 52 of the Administration of Justice Act 1956 provided:

Evidence of foreign law

See sections 4(2) and 4(4)(a) and (b) of the Civil Evidence Act 1972.

Reciprocal enforcement of foreign judgments

See article 2(1)(a) of the Convention set out in the Schedule to the Reciprocal Enforcement of Foreign Judgments (Israel) Order 1971 (S.I. 1971/1039).

See article 2(1)(a) of the Convention set out in the Schedule to the Reciprocal Enforcement of Foreign Judgments (the Netherlands) Order 1969 (S.I. 1969/1063)

See article 2(1)(a) of the Convention set out in the Schedule to the Reciprocal Enforcement of Foreign Judgments (Norway) Order 1962 (S.I. 1962/636)

Power to authorise superior landlord to enter and execute works

See section 30(3) of the Housing, Town Planning, &c. Act 1919.

Power of court to authorise examination of works on unfit premises or for improvement

See section 164(3) of the Housing Act 1957.

Land Charges Act 1925

See section 20(2) of that Act.

Merger with the High Court
On the appointed day the Court of Chancery of the County Palatine of Lancaster was merged with the High Court. Accordingly, on and after that day no jurisdiction, whether conferred by statute or otherwise, could be exercised, or can now be exercised, by the Court of Chancery of the County Palatine of Lancaster as such. The Court of Chancery of the County Palatine of Lancaster was abolished on merger with the High Court.

Transitional provisions
Transitional provisions were contained in Part I of Schedule 5 to the Courts Act 1971.

Offices
Any judicial or other office in the Court of Chancery of the County Palatine of Lancaster, other than the office of Vice-Chancellor of the County Palatine of Lancaster, was abolished by section 44(1)(b) of the Courts Act 1971.

Section 44(2) conferred a power to make regulations to provide for the compensation of persons who suffered loss of employment or loss or diminution of emoluments attributable to the effect of section 44(1)(b) or to the merger of the Court of Chancery of the County Palatine of Lancaster.

References
Halsbury's Laws of England, First Edition, Butterworth & Co, London, (Agents for Canada: Canada Law Book Company, Toronto), 1909, Volume 9
O Hood Phillips. "2. The Chancery Courts of Lancaster and Durham". A First Book of English Law. Fourth Edition. Sweet and Maxwell. 1960. Pages 74 and 75.
James Jones Aston. The Jurisdiction, Practice, and Proceedings of the Court of Chancery of the County Palatine of Lancaster. Wm Benning & Co. London. Addison. Preston. 1853. Google Books
Thomas Snow. The Lancaster Chancery Practice. W Maxwell. London. 1885. WorldCat HathiTrust
Bridgemann, Charles George Orlando. Orders and Rules of the Court of Chancery of the County Palatine of Lancaster of 1 August 1884, 27 and 28 November 1884. T Brakell. Liverpool. 1884. Internet Archive
James W Winstanley. The Chancery of the County Palatine of Lancaster: Its Practice and Modes of Procedure, as Distinguished from the High Court of Chancery. Henry Greenwood. 1855. Google Books
R Somerville. "The Palatine Courts in Lancashire". In A Harding (ed). Law Making and Law Makers in British History: Papers Presented to the Edinburgh Legal History Conference, 1977. (Studies in History 22). Royal Historical Society. 1980.

Former courts and tribunals in England and Wales
Legal history of England
Duchy of Lancaster
Courts of equity
1972 disestablishments in England
Courts and tribunals disestablished in 1972